The 1896 United States presidential election in Colorado took place on November 3, 1896. All contemporary 45 states were part of the 1896 United States presidential election. Colorado voters chose four electors to the Electoral College, which selected the president and vice president.

Background
In its early days as a state, Colorado had like the Plains States to its east been solidly Republican. However, with crises emerging in its agricultural sector from low wheat prices and a severe drought in 1888 and 1889, and the state’s underdevelopment leading to resentment of the Northeast, the new Populist Party was able to largely take over the state’s politics in the early 1890s. Aided by fusion with the minority Democratic Party and strong support for free silver in this state which produced over half of all American silver, the Populist Party under James B. Weaver in 1892 carried the state’s presidential electoral votes and won both its congressional seats. After the Republicans gained a 130-seat majority in the House of Representatives following the 1894 elections, five dissident Republicans from the Mountain States who supported free silver jointed together as the “Silver Republicans” They supported nominating Centennial State Senator Teller at first, but ultimately this was viewed as impractical and the Silver Republicans fused with Democrat/Populist William Jennings Bryan.

Bryan’s support for free silver against the existing gold standard supported by Republican nominee William McKinley ensured he had virtually unanimous support from Colorado’s silver-dependent business elite.

Vote
Once a fusion between Democrats, Populists and Silver Republicans was fully finalised, there was no campaigning in Colorado as all polls showed Bryan would carry the state very easily. Bryan in the end carried Colorado by more than seventy percentage points, by over twenty percent the best performance by any presidential candidate in the history of the state. Bryan carried all but two of Colorado’s counties, and won nineteen with over ninety percent of the vote, with McKinley retaining significant support only on the eastern High Plains, where the power of the silver magnates was much less.

Bryan would win Colorado against William McKinley again in 1900 and would later also win the state against William Howard Taft in 1908, making the state one of just two western states Bryan would carry in all three of his runs (the other being Nevada).

Results

Results by county

Notes

References

Colorado
1896
1896 Colorado elections